Celestial Movies (天映频道) is an Asian 24-hour Chinese movie channel, which screens films from and shows interviews with movie stars and directors, entertainment news and film award ceremonies. The channel is available in 11 territories across Asia Pacific, including Mainland China, Hong Kong, Malaysia, Philippines, Singapore, Indonesia, Thailand, Sri Lanka, Vietnam and other countries in Asia.

Due to an agreement between Celestial Tiger Entertainment and Astro Holding Sdn Bhd, the channel didn't appear on other TV providers in Malaysia until 1 October 2021, when the channel launched in Unifi TV on channel 288 as a replacement for Star Chinese Movies due to Disney's pay TV closure.

Movie line-up 
The channel features Chinese movies from regional film studios such as Media Asia, Emperor Motion Pictures, Filmko Pictures, Orange Sky Golden Harvest, CJ Entertainment and Toho.

Scheduling 
On weeknights, movies are scheduled by genres: namely Drama Monday, Action Tuesday, Comedy Wednesday, Bromance Thursday and Fantasy Friday. During Saturday and Sunday nights, Celestial Movies showcases blockbusters and first-run movies.

Other programmes include news of movie and film-festival from around the globe, documentaries and shorts. Celestial also produces a number of original behind-the-scenes programmes such as: Celestial Cameos, Director To Director, Celestial Express and Star Talk.

Sister channels

Celestial Classic Movies
Celestial Classic Movies (CCM) is a 24-hour pay-TV movie channel screening Chinese classic movies from the Shaw Brothers library and other film libraries. For best visual and sound quality, all Shaw Brothers movies are digitally restored to match the original cinematic prints.

Celestial Movies Pinoy (Philippines)
Celestial Tiger Entertainment has teamed with Viva Communications to create Celestial Movies Pinoy, a localized Philippines version of CTE’s Chinese film channel Celestial Movies. The channel was launched on January 1, 2016 on the basic tier of DTH satellite provider Cignal TV. Movies and on-air presentations are dubbed in a mixture of Tagalog and English.  Their programming is a mix of Chinese-language movies and TV series, behind-the-scenes specials, interviews with Chinese talent and thematic programming centered around superstars or popular genres.

Celestial Movies Asia

Celestial Movies Asia (CMA) was a 24-hour pay-TV movie channel that featured movies from the Celestial Movies and Celestial Classic Movies channels in Asia. With a choice of more than 100 titles from Japan, Korea, Hong Kong, Mainland China, Taiwan, Thailand, and Singapore every month, CMA offered Asian cinema and premieres a variety of regional movies.  Every Saturday night, CMA showcases Asian blockbusters of selected topics or genre. While on every Sunday night, CMA broadcasts the latest or even non-screened Asian movies exclusively in Celestial Asia Premiere.

Celestial Movies Asia has since rebranded to Celestial Movies in Hong Kong since 15 February 2011.

Singtel and Celestial Tiger Entertainment, the owner of the Celestial Movies network made a carrier deal to launch CM+ on 1 October 2021 at 1200 hrs SGT, officially replacing the former cHK channel and currently exclusive to Singapore, serves as alternative to the currently closed Star Chinese Movies due to Disney's pay TV closure.

References

External links
CELESTIAL MOVIES Official Site
CELESTIAL MOVIES ASIA
CELESTIAL CLASSIC MOVIES
Celestial Pictures
ASTRO All Asia Networks plc

References
Newers, Television Asia, Celestial Movies Asia and Celestial Classic Movies channels debut on now TV, retrieved on June 30, 2009, https://web.archive.org/web/20090826074650/http://www.newser.com/archive-arts-living-news/1G1-179075879/celestial-movies-asia-and-celestial-classic-movies-channels-debut-on-now-tvnews.html
Access My Library, Television Asia, Celestial Movies Asia and Celestial Classic Movies channels debut on now TV, retrieved on June 30, 2009, http://www.accessmylibrary.com/coms2/summary_0286-34498254_ITM
Celestial Pictures, TV Channels, retrieved on June 30, 2009, https://web.archive.org/web/20090626032120/http://www.celestialpictures.com/level2_cm.cfm
Media Research Asia (2008), Two Celestial Pictures Join the now TV Lineup, retrieved on June 30, 2009, https://web.archive.org/web/20110714064545/http://www.mediaresearchasia.com/view2.php?type=press&id=153
 Screendaily.com (2007), "Celestial Movies launches on Indonesia's TELKOMVision", retrieved on June 30, 2009
 Television Asia (2008), "Celestial Movies Asia and Celestial Classic Movies channels debut on now TV", retrieved on June 30, 2009, HighBeam
 Television Asia (20030, "Celestial Movies launched at the most auspicious time: 3pm on the 3rd day of the 3rd month of the 3rd year of the millennium. Clearly Asia's newest channel is taking as few chances as possible", retrieved on June 30, 2009, http://www.accessmylibrary.com/coms2/summary_0286-22891271_ITM
 Television Asia Plus Website, "Channel Description", retrieved on June 30, 2009, https://web.archive.org/web/20090804224022/http://www.onscreenasia.com/annualguide/Channels/detail-10-CELESTIAL%20MOVIES
 Variety.com (2015), "CTE, Viva To Launch Filipino Version of Celestial Movies Channel", retrieved on November 16, 2015

Television networks in China
Movie channels
Television channels and stations established in 2008
Television channels and stations established in 2003
Lionsgate subsidiaries